Tappeh may refer to various places in Iran:
 Tappeh, Germi, Ardabil Province
 Tappeh, Namin, Ardabil Province
 Tappeh Now, Bushehr Province
 Tappeh, Gilan
 Tappeh, Bijar, Kurdistan Province
 Tappeh, Kamyaran, Kurdistan Province
 Tappeh, Markazi
 Tappeh, Mazandaran
 Tappeh, alternate name of Nezam Mahalleh, Mazandaran Province
 Tappeh, Behshahr, Mazandaran Province
 Tappeh-Ye-Now, Mazandaran Province
 Tappeh, North Khorasan
 Tappeh, West Azerbaijan